Arshi is a name, and may refer to:

People
 Amar Arshi, Punjabi singer
 Mona Arshi, British poet
 Arshi, King Shakuni's wife
 Arshi Khan, Indian model, actress, internet celebrity
 Arshi Pipa (1920–1997), Albanian philosopher, writer, poet and literary critic

Other
 Arshi Tengri, Mongolian god